Paul Niemeyer may refer to:

 Paul Niemeyer (doctor) (1832–1890), German physician
 Paul V. Niemeyer (born 1941), federal judge on the United States Court of Appeals for the Fourth Circuit

See also
 Niemeyer